Come Along, Do! is an 1898 British short silent comedy film, produced and directed by Robert W. Paul. The film was of 1 minute duration, but only 38 seconds has survived. The whole of the second shot is only available as film stills.

The film features an elderly man at an art gallery who takes a great interest in a nude statue to the irritation of his wife.

The film has cinematographic significance as the first example of film continuity. It was, according to Michael Brooke of BFI Screenonline, "one of the first films to feature more than one shot." In the first shot, an elderly couple is outside an art exhibition having lunch and then follow other people inside through the door. The second shot shows what they do inside.

References

External links

1890s British films
British black-and-white films
British silent short films
1898 comedy films
1898 films
British comedy short films
1898 short films
Films directed by Robert W. Paul
Silent comedy films